Pietro Paolo Caravaggio (1617 - 1688) or Petro Paulo Caravagio was an Italian mathematician.

Life 
Citizen of the Duchy of Milan during the Spanish domination, he was a professor of mathematics at the Palatine School and a close friend of the poet and mathematician Tommaso Ceva. 
He is well known for the work In geometria male restaurata that he dedicated to king Philip IV of Spain, in which he introduces geometry as the queen of arts, architecture, industry, and domain of the territory.

Works

References 

Italian mathematicians